Wietzendorf (Eastphalian: Witzendörp) is a municipality in the district of Heidekreis, in Lower Saxony, Germany. It is situated approximately 14 km southeast of Soltau, and 50 km southwest of Lüneburg. The population as of 31 December 2012 is 4,071 people.

World War II
During World War II, a camp for prisoners of war (Kriegsgefangenenlager), including a section for officers (Oflag 83), was located near Wietzendorf. The camp was initially used for Soviet prisoners from the Eastern Front; later it was partially evacuated because of the poor sanitary conditions and used to house other prisoners, including many Italian war prisoners (Italienische Militaerinternierte) which Nazi Germany considered to have lost their military status, as they had declined to follow Mussolini's orders after the armistice between Italy and the Allies. Among the Italian prisoners was Giovannino Guareschi, who would later become world-renowned as the author of Don Camillo and Alessandro Natta, later General Secretary of the PCI.

Gallery

References

External links
 

Heidekreis